The 2020–21 AFC Wimbledon season was the club's 19th season in their history and the fifth consecutive season in EFL League One. Along with League One, the club also participated in the FA Cup, EFL Cup and EFL Trophy. It was their first season based in their spiritual home of Wimbledon at the newly built Plough Lane stadium. They played at Loftus Road until the stadium was completed on 3 November. On Friday 6 November it was announced there had been a covid outbreak amongst the first team squad leading to the matches against Barrow in the FA Cup and the league fixture against Wigan being postponed. Over the weekend all members of the first team squad, staff and the U18s squad received covid testing and on Sunday the 8th it was announced the club would have to undergo a 2-week circuit breaker with all players and staff having to self isolate for 2 weeks.

The season covers the period from 1 July 2020 to 30 June 2021.

Transfers

Transfers in

Loans in

Loans out

Transfers out

Pre-season
With fans still unable to attend games due to COVID-19, AFC Wimbledon began pre-season with a behind-closed-doors friendly match against Corinthian-Casuals.

Competitions

EFL League One

League table

Results summary

Results by matchday

Matches

The 2020–21 season fixtures were released on 21 August.

FA Cup

The draw for the first round was made on Monday 26, October. The second round draw was revealed on Monday, 9 November by Danny Cowley.

EFL Cup

The first round draw was made on 18 August, live on Sky Sports, by Paul Merson.

EFL Trophy

The regional group stage draw was confirmed on 18 August. The second round draw was made by Matt Murray on 20 November, at St Andrew’s. The third round was made on 10 December 2020 by Jon Parkin.

Statistics

|}

Goals record

Disciplinary record

Notes

References

AFC Wimbledon
AFC Wimbledon seasons
AFC Wimbledon
AFC Wimbledon